Total Carnage is a multidirectional shooter arcade video game originally developed and published by Midway in North America in January 1992. Set in the fictional country of Kookistan during 1999, players assume the role of Captain Carnage and Major Mayhem from the Doomsday Squad in a last-ditch effort to overthrow dictator General Akhboob and his army of mutants from conquering the world, while also rescuing POWs held by his military force.

Total Carnage was created by most of the same team who previously worked on Williams' 1990 arcade game Smash TV and shares many gameplay elements. Initially released in  arcades, the game was ported to the Amiga, CD32, Jaguar, Game Boy, MS-DOS, and Super Nintendo Entertainment System. The game has been included in multiple compilations, such as Midway Arcade Treasures 2, Midway Arcade Treasures Deluxe Edition and Midway Arcade Origins.

The arcade version of Total Carnage received positive reception from critics, but it was not successful financially. The ports were met with mixed critical response. Designer Mark Turmell would go to work on the highly successful NBA Jam.

Gameplay 

Total Carnage is a multidirectional shooter similar to Smash TV where players assume the role of Captain Carnage (P1) and Major Mayhem (P2) from the Doomsday Squad across three stages, each with a boss at the end that must be fought before progressing any further, in a last-ditch effort to overthrow dictator General Akhboob and his army of mutants from conquering the world by invading Akhboob's "Baby Milk Factory" base, while also rescuing POWs held by his military force as the main objective. The players' characters are patterned after John Rambo while the setting is influenced by the 1991 Persian Gulf War (including the Abu Ghraib Infant Formula Plant).

Players move their respective characters with the left joystick, while the right joystick shoots bullets against enemies. Players can also enter a password at the beginning of the game to warp their player character into any location of the game. Getting hit by enemy fire or colliding against dangerous stage obstacles will result in losing a life and once all lives are lost, the game is over unless the players insert more credits into the arcade machine to continue playing.

The game shares many gameplay elements with Williams' previous title, while also adding new ones as well including two-player simultaneous play, stage scrolling, large enemy vehicles, the ability to collect and place bombs, and a much wider range of gameplay scenarios.

Development 

Total Carnage was created by most of the same team behind Williams' Smash TV, some of which would also later go on to work at other Midway franchise such as Mortal Kombat and NBA Jam. Mark Turmell served as lead developer and programmer of the project alongside Shawn Liptak and Robotron: 2084 co-creator Eugene Jarvis. Artists Jim Gentile, John Tobias and Tony Goskie were responsible for the pixel art, while Jonathan Hey was in charge of its sound design. Mortal Kombat co-creator Ed Boon was the voice of General Akhboob.

Originally the game was programmed to display one of two endings upon completion of the Pleasure Dome bonus stage. One ending would feature the women and playable characters from Smash TV and was to be displayed if the player collected all the treasures in the dome. A second "bad" ending showed the same screen without the women along with a message challenging the player to collect all the dome's treasure. However, a bug in the game caused the "good" ending to be displayed with the "bad" ending text no matter how many treasures were collected. The bug was uncovered during the testing for 2012's Midway Arcade Origins compilation. In response, Turmell stated that he remembers writing working code for both endings, but was not sure why the code was changed. He suggested that he might have kept the bug as a joke on players and went unfixed in Origins.

Ports 
The Amiga and CD32 versions were created by UK-based developer International Computer Entertainment, with Keith Weatherly and Simon Fox acting as programmers of the conversion, while Ellen Hopkins and Mike Jary were responsible for adapting the artwork as well. Both Weatherly and Fox recounted the development process and history of the Amiga version between 1993 and 1994 through publications such as The One for Amiga Games and Amiga Format. Weatherly and Fox stated that the conversion took over a year to develop with Midway supervising its production and the team originally had plans to integrate elements that were scrapped from the original arcade release but were ultimately discarded in the end. Midway provided both artwork and source code of the arcade original to the team at ICE, although adapting the former into the Amiga proved to be difficult, as both Weatherly and Fox stated that the number of colors and animations were reduced to fit the hardware.

Cancelled ports 
Versions for both the Sega CD and Sega Genesis were in development by Black Pearl Software and planned to be published by Malibu Games but neither port were officially released to the public for unknown reasons, despite being advertised and previewed in a few video game magazines. A prototype cartridge of the Genesis port is currently under ownership of video game collector Jason Wilson.

Release 
Total Carnage was first released in arcades by Midway in January 1992. In late 1993, The game was ported to the Super Nintendo Entertainment System by Black Pearl Software and published by Malibu Games. This version mimics the dual control aspect of the arcade original by mapping the console's four main buttons (A, B, X and Y) like a D-pad, enabling the player to shoot in one direction while running in another. In February 1994, a Game Boy port of the title was released by Malibu Games across North America and Europe. In mid-1994, it was also ported to the Amiga and Amiga CD32 by International Computer Entertainment. Around the same time period, a MS-DOS conversion by British developer Hand Made Software was released as well. The original arcade game was first re-released in 2004 as part of Midway Arcade Treasures 2 for the PlayStation 2, Xbox and Nintendo GameCube game consoles. In 2005, an Atari Jaguar version by Hand Made Software that previously went unpublished was released worldwide by Songbird Productions, nearly ten years after work on the game originally began. The arcade version was later re-released in 2006 as part of Midway Arcade Treasures Deluxe Edition for the PC and in 2012 as part of Midway Arcade Origins for PlayStation 3 and Xbox 360.

Reception 

RePlay reported Total Carnage to be the third most-popular arcade game in the United States in May 1992. According to Liptak, Total Carnage failed to reach the target of 2,000 arcade cabinets ordered. The game's slow sales resulted in Turmell taking on a different project for his next game, which would become the highly successful NBA Jam.

In a coin-op feature, Sinclair User rated the arcade game 96% and called it a "classic cartoon style cathartic experience", dubbing it the "best game of 1992". In 2009, the game's trademark was abandoned.

Notes

References

External links 
 Total Carnage at AtariAge
 Total Carnage at GameFAQs
 Total Carnage at Giant Bomb
 Total Carnage at Killer List of Videogames
 Total Carnage at MobyGames

1992 video games
Alternate history video games
Amiga games
Amiga 1200 games
Arcade video games
Atari Jaguar games
Cancelled Sega CD games
Cancelled Sega Genesis games
Amiga CD32 games
Cooperative video games
DOS games
Fictional mutants
Game Boy games
Hand Made Software games
ICE Software games
Malibu Interactive games
Midway video games
Twin-stick shooters
Multiplayer and single-player video games
Songbird Productions games
Super Nintendo Entertainment System games
Video games developed in the United States
Video games scored by Jonathan Hey
Video games set in the 1990s
Video games set in 1999
Video games with alternate endings
Black Pearl Software games